Warlords is an out-of-print collectible card game published in September 1997 by Iron Crown Enterprises.

Gameplay
Based on the Warlords III computer game, Warlords is a simple multi-player fantasy game. The objective is to become the first player to become the supreme Warlord. This is achieved by exploring, finding treasure, or waging war by assembling followers, gathering armies, and building citadels. The game was criticized for using a "Combat Resolution Table" where a player would add the Battle Value of their Army, Hero, Ally, and Artefact (sic) in a given stack, add terrain bonuses, subtracts the defender's total Battle Value, and then compare it to the table to determine the number of cards lost in each stack. The cards had no rarities and lacked tournament support at the time.

Reception
The reviewer from the online second volume of Pyramid stated that "Warlords. One of the best tactical combat games ever created for home computers. [...] Now it's a trading card game designed by the same folks as the computer games, and let me tell you its one of the most enjoyable TCGs I've played yet."

References

External links
Warlords at BoardGameGeek

Card games introduced in 1997
Collectible card games
Iron Crown Enterprises games